Kanakpur, is a grampanchayat headquarter village in the southern state of Karnataka, India, this village previously called with name Karakmukli. It is located in the Chincholi taluk of Kalaburagi district.

Demographics
 India census Karakmukli had a population of 2185 with 1072 males and 1113 females.

Education Institutions
Schools in kanakpur are
Government higher primary school kanakpur
Government high school kanakpur

For further studies  students need to travel (13 km) from kanakpur.
Govt first grade college chincholi.
HKES's Smt. C.B. Patil Arts & Commerce Degree College, Chincholi.
Siddarath college of education chincholi.
Govt first grade college sulepeth.
Government Industrial training institute, chincholi.
To study technical education Diploma and Engineering student need to travel or stay 40 to 80 km, of nearer cities Humnabad, Kalagi, Gulbarga, Bidar.

Universities
The nearest universities are Gulbarga University and Central University of Karnataka

Agriculture
Major Crops produced in the Karakmukli are Pigeon pea, Sorghum, Pearl millet, chickpea, mung bean, vigna mungo.

Transport
KSRTC bus facility is available to travel within the Karnataka state and Nabour states, to travel within 15 to 20 km, share auto available. The nearest railway station is (43 km) tandur railway station TDU and Sedam railway station. The nearest domestic airport is Gulbarga Airport  and Rajiv Gandhi International Airport (155 km) is the international airport.

See also
 Gulbarga
 Districts of Karnataka
 State Highway 75 (Karnataka)

References

External links
 http://Gulbarga.nic.in
 Map

Villages in Kalaburagi district